Carla Spletter (9 November 1911 – 19 October 1953) was a German operatic soprano.

Life 
Carla Spletter was born in Flensburg, Schleswig-Holstein in Germany in 1911, and studied at the Leipzig Conservatory before  making her debut in 1932 at the Deutsche Oper in Berlin. From 1935 to 1945 she was a member of the Berlin State Opera. Her repertoire included Carl Maria von Weber's Oberon (1937) and Johann Strauss II's Eine Nacht in Venedig (1938), both of which she recorded. After 1945 Carla Spletter moved to Hamburg to join the Hamburgische Staatsoper. Her last appearance was that of the title role in Alban Berg's opera Lulu for the German (Grillo-Theater, Essen) and Dutch (Stadsschouwburg, Amsterdam) premieres of that work in March and July 1953 respectively, under the baton of Gustav König. Within a few months (October) she had died in Hamburg of cancer at the age of 41.

In 1937 Carla Spletter married Dr Peter Bischoff, who had won a gold medal in sailing at the 1936 Olympic Games.

Legacy 
I addition to her recordings Carla Spletter featured in four feature films, including the title role in Friedrich von Flotow's Martha (1936).

Selected discography 
 Mozart: Die Entführung aus dem Serail (Berlin, 24 October 1937), Reichssenders Berlin, conducted by Heinrich Steiner, Cantus-Lin (DA Music) 2000
 Mozart: Great Opera Recordings - Die Zauberflöte (Berlin 1937/1938), Berliner Philharmoniker, conducted by Thomas Beecham, Naxos Historical 2001
 Gounod: Faust (Stuttgart 5 December 1937), Stuttgarter Rundfunks, conducted by Joseph Keilberth, Arkadia 2000
 Mozart: Die Zauberflöte (Berlin 1937–1938), Berliner Philharmoniker, conducted by Thomas Beecham, Naxos Historical 2001
 Weber: Oberon (Highlights, Berlin 15 August 1937), Reichssenders Berlin, conducted by Joseph Keilberth, Cantus-Line (DA Music) 2002
 Johann Strauss: Eine Nacht in Venedig (22 January 1938), Reichssenders Berlin, conducted by Heinrich Steiner, Naxos Historical 2003
 ABC der Gesangskunst in Deutschland - Historisches Gesangslexikon Teil 5, 70 historical recordings, including two arias from La Boheme by Carla Spletter, Cantus-Lin (DA Music), 2000

Filmography 
 1936: Martha, Directed by: Karl Anton/Frank Clifford
 1937: Der Schauspieldirektor, Directed by: Jürgen von Alten
 1939: Maria Ilona, Directed by: Géza von Bolváry
 1940: Falstaff in Wien, Directed by: Leopold Hainisch

References

External links 
 Einträge zu Carla Spletter in der Musikdatenbank akuma.de
 
 Personsuche
 Deutschen Nationalbibliothek

German operatic sopranos
People from Flensburg
1911 births
1953 deaths
20th-century German  women opera singers
University of Music and Theatre Leipzig alumni